Seeburger AG is a German software company founded in 1986.  Its primary product is the Seeburger Business Integration Suite (BIS).

History
By 2000 Seeburger had developed software called "Jess" for writing scripts to convert data in EDIFACT or XML format for use with SAP R/3.

In October 2020, the board members of Seeburger (Simone Zeuchner, Katrin Seeburger, Ralph Jacoby) were elected for another five years.

In December 2016 Seeburger held an open house to celebrate its thirtieth anniversary. The company celebrated its thirty-fifth anniversary during mid-2021.

 the company had approximately 1,000 employees.

Business Integration Suite
The Seeburger Business Integration Suite (BIS) is a computing platform used in business-to-business transactions.  The BIS handles transfer of files and mapping of API calls between separate systems.

References

Companies established in 1986
Companies based in Baden-Württemberg